Lores may refer to:

 Lore (anatomy)
 Lores (surname)

See also
 Lore (disambiguation)